Cosmin Popescu may refer to:

 Cosmin Popescu (environmental scientist) (born 1974), Romanian environmental scientist
 Cosmin Popescu (gymnast) (born 1986), Romanian artistic gymnast